The Covilhã International Hill Climb, is an annual automobile hillclimb to the summit in Serra da Estrela in Covilhã, Portugal. The track measures , climbing  from the start at km 31.810 on EN 339 (846 m above sea level), to the finish at km 26.570 (1300 m above the sea level), on grades averaging 9,12%.

The above paragraph uses continental not english numeric conventions and need correction

The race was on the FIA FIA International Hill Climb Cup Events Calendar and features on Portugal National Hill Climb Championships. It has taken place since 1976. It is currently contested by a variety of classes of cars, (touring cars, sportscars, single-seater).

The current record was set in 2009 by the Italian driver Simone Faggioli, on the wheel of an Osella FA 30, with the time of 2:58.839.

Winners

See also
 European Hill Climb Championship
 Hillclimbing
 Mont Ventoux Hill Climb
 Pikes Peak International Hill Climb

References

External links
  - website about Czech and European hill climbs
  - Most complete European Hill Climb Championship race results 1957-today by ing. Roman Krejčí

Hillclimbing
Hill climb